Charles Fairbanks may refer to:

Charles W. Fairbanks (1852–1918), American politician and vice-president
Charles H. Fairbanks (1913–1984), American archaeologist/anthropologist
Charles B. Fairbanks (1827–1859), American writer
Charles Rufus Fairbanks (1790–1841), Canadian lawyer, judge, entrepreneur and political figure